Orange Air, LLC was an American charter airline that began service in 2014. It was based at Orlando Sanford International Airport and was headquartered on the grounds of the airport.

History
Orange Air began operating sports charters in late 2014. It began its first public charter service in May 2015 operating for Branson Air Express on a Cincinnati-Branson-New Orleans-Cancún routing. On October 5, 2015, the Cincinnati leg was terminated, and the Branson-New Orleans-Cancun portion of the route was transferred to Elite Airways.

Orange announced on October 15, 2015, that it would be adding the Boeing 737-800 to start replacing their MD-80s and also to add more seats. The number of orders was not announced. Orange Air said that the Boeing 737 is the industry leading aircraft, is fuel efficient and is happy to operate the aircraft. However, Orange Air never took delivery of any 737s. The airline laid off most of its staff in August 2016 and returned its operating certificate to the FAA in April 2017.

Fleet

Orange Air operated a fleet of MD-80 aircraft. At one point it operated as many as five aircraft.

See also
List of defunct airlines of the United States

References

External links
Official website

Airlines established in 2011
Airlines disestablished in 2017
Defunct airlines of the United States
Sanford, Florida
2011 establishments in Florida
2017 disestablishments in Florida